Red Cadeaux (6 March 2006 – 21 November 2015) was a British-bred Thoroughbred racehorse who was a triple runner up in the Melbourne Cup in 2011, 2013 and 2014.

Racing career

Notable performances by Red Cadeaux include:

 June 2011 - 1st in Group 3 Curragh Cup (2800m)
 September 2011 - 3rd in the Group One Irish St Leger (2800m)
 November 2011 - 2nd in the Group One Melbourne Cup (3200m) behind Dunaden with Lucas Cranach 3rd.
 December 2011 - 3rd in the Group 1 Hong Kong Vase (2400m) 
 May 2012 - 1st in the Yorkshire Cup (2800m)
 November 2012 - 8th in the Melbourne Cup behind Green Moon, Fiorente and Jakkalberry.
 November 2012 - 8th in the Japan Cup (2400m)
 December 2012 - 1st in the Hong Kong Vase
 March 2013 - 2nd in the Group One Dubhai World Cup (2000m) behind Animal Kingdom with Planteur 3rd
 November 2013 - 2nd in the Melbourne Cup behind Fiorente with Mount Athos 3rd.
 November 2014 - 2nd in the Melbourne Cup behind Protectionist with Who Shot Thebarman 3rd.
 April 2015 - 2nd in the Queen Elizabeth Stakes (2000m, Randwick)

He was euthanized on 21 November 2015, following complications after surgery for a sesamoid bone fracture in his left front fetlock. The injury was sustained during the 2015 Melbourne Cup, his fifth appearance in the event.

He garnered $8 million in prize money during his career. He was due to spend his retirement at the Living Legends quarter in Melbourne,  but as per his owner's request Red Cadeux was buried at Flemington.

References

External links
 Red Cadeaux pedigree

2006 racehorse births
2015 racehorse deaths
Racehorses bred in the United Kingdom
Racehorses trained in the United Kingdom
Thoroughbred family 9-e